The 2017 Minneapolis City Council election was held on November 7, 2017, to elect the members of the Minneapolis City Council. The political composition remained unchanged, with the Minnesota Democratic–Farmer–Labor Party (DFL) retaining 12 seats and the Green Party of Minnesota one seat. Three DFL incumbents were defeated by intraparty opponents. The new City Council convened on January 8, 2018.

Retiring members

DFL 
 Elizabeth Glidden, Ward 8
 Jacob Frey, Ward 3
 Ran for mayor of Minneapolis.

Electoral system 
The 13 members of the City Council were elected from single-member districts via instant-runoff voting, commonly known as ranked choice voting, for four-year terms. Voters had the option of ranking up to three candidates in order of preference. Municipal elections in Minnesota are officially nonpartisan, although candidates were able to identify with a political party on the ballot. Write-in candidates must have filed a request with the Minneapolis Elections & Voter Services Division for votes for them to be counted.

Candidates

Results

There were clear winners in several wards on election night. Green Council Member Cam Gordon (Ward 2), who did not have an opponent, won re-election. Other council members who won on election night include DFLers Lisa Goodman (Ward 7), Lisa Bender (Ward 10), Andrew Johnson (Ward 12), and Linea Palmisano (Ward 13). Ward 8 DFL candidate Andrea Jenkins also won, replacing retiring DFL Council Member Elizabeth Glidden. Wards which did not have a clear winner underwent several rounds of vote transfers on November 8.

Three incumbents lost re-election. DFL Council President Barb Johnson (Ward 4) lost to DFL candidate Phillipe Cunningham, DFL Council Member Blong Yang (Ward 5) to DFL candidate Jeremiah Ellison, and DFL Council Member John Quincy (Ward 11) to DFL candidate Jeremy Schroeder. DFL Council Members Kevin Reich (Ward 1), Abdi Warsame (Ward 6), and Alondra Cano (Ward 9) retained their seats.

In Ward 3, DFL candidate Steve Fletcher won over Socialist Alternative candidate Ginger Jentzen, who won the most first-choice votes but did not gain sufficient transfer votes. This was the first occurrence of the initial leader not ending up the winner of an election in Minneapolis since it switched to ranked-choice voting in 2009. A similar situation subsequently occurred in Ward 4 in which Johnson lost to Cunningham.
 
Jenkins and Cunningham are the first transgender persons to be elected to the City Council.

Ward 1

Ward 2

Ward 3

Ward 4

Ward 5

Ward 6

Ward 7

Ward 8

Ward 9

Ward 10

Ward 11

Ward 12

Ward 13

President of the City Council election 
After the election, which resulted in the defeat of Council President Barb Johnson, it was reported that DFL Council Members Lisa Bender, Linea Palmisano, and Council Member-elect Andrea Jenkins were seeking to replace her. When the new City Council convened on January 8, 2018, it unanimously elected Bender to be president.

Following Bender's election, it was revealed that Jenkins and Palmisano were respectively seeking to be elected president and vice-president as a ticket. Bender said that while she had the votes to defeat them and install her supporters as chairs of choice committees, she wanted to avoid the Council splitting into factions that had sometimes characterized the previous City Council. As part of a deal to get her unanimous support and to present a united front, Bender agreed that Jenkins would be vice-president, who was also elected unanimously. A new committee structure was agreed to and council members that did not nominally support her would be given choice committee chairs. Bender said that all council members had to compromise. A final deal was not reached until January 7.

See also 
 Minneapolis mayoral election, 2017
 Minneapolis municipal election, 2017

Notes

References

External links 
 Minneapolis Elections & Voter Services

Minneapolis City Council
Minneapolis 2017
Minneapolis 2017
Minneapolis City Council